Quincy Julian Boltron Kammeraad (born 1 February 2001) is a professional footballer who plays as a goalkeeper for Kaya–Iloilo of the Philippines Football League (PFL).

Club career

Global
Kammeraad started his career with Filipino side Global after playing for the youth academy of Zeeburgia in the Dutch lower leagues, but left due to not receiving payment and homesickness, before returning to the youth academy of Zeeburgia.

Azkals Development Team
Before the 2020 season, he signed for Filipino club Azkals Development Team.

Kaya–Iloilo
After a two-year stint with the Azkals Development Team, it was announced that Kammeraad joined Kaya–Iloilo ahead of their 2022 AFC Cup campaign.

International career

Philippines U19
In October 2017, Kammeraad was called up to the Philippines U-19 for the 2018 AFC U-19 Championship qualification matches against Myanmar U-19, China U-19, and Cambodia U-19.

Philippines U23
In October 2021, Kammeraad was called up to the Philippines U-23 for the 2022 AFC U-23 Asian  Cup qualification matches against South Korea U-23, Singapore U-23, and Timor-Leste U-23. He made his debut in a 3-0 defeat against South Korea U-23

Kammeraad was included in the 20-man squad for 31st Southeast Asian Games, which was held in Vietnam.

Philippines
In December 2021, Kammeraad was named in Philippines 23-man squad for the 2020 AFF Championship held in Singapore.

Personal life 
Kammeraad was born in the Netherlands to a Filipino mother and Dutch father.

References

External links
 Quincy Kammeraad at playmakerstats.com

Dutch people of Filipino descent
Citizens of the Philippines through descent
Dutch footballers
Expatriate footballers in the Philippines
Dutch expatriate footballers
Association football goalkeepers
Philippines Football League players
Footballers from Haarlem
2001 births
Living people
Azkals Development Team players
Competitors at the 2021 Southeast Asian Games
Southeast Asian Games competitors for the Philippines